Baguia, officially Baguia Administrative Post, is an administrative post (and was formerly a subdistrict) in Baucau municipality, East Timor.

Taur Matan Ruak, president of East Timor between 2012 and 2017, was born in  suco, Baguia Administrative Post, in 1956.

Sucos
 Afaloicai 
  (Alaua-Craik, Alaua Craic)
  (Alaua-Leten)
  (Defawase, Defa-Uasse)
  (Hae-Coni, Haeconi)
  (Lari Sula)
 
  (Osso-Huna)
 Samalari

References

External links 

  – information page on Ministry of State Administration site 

Administrative posts of East Timor
Baucau Municipality